Eric J. Gibson is a game designer who has worked primarily on role-playing games.

Career
Eric J. Gibson's Purgatory Publishing became the new owner of West End Games, and the deal was announced by previous owner Humanoids Publishing on November 14, 2003. Gibson's purchase of West End involved the Masterbook, D6 System and its derivative D6 Legend rules systems, as well as the Bloodshadows, Shatterzone and Torg settings,  and the West End trademark. As part of his contribution to West End, Gibson made the d6 classic system into a more generic rules system. Gibson intended to publish a new edition of Torg, but only produced two PDFs for the Torg line.

When West End was having difficulty financing their publications, Gibson turned to Bill Coffin to publish his Septimus role-playing game, but even with preorders Gibson did not have enough money to print the book, and announced in 2008 that he was cancelling Septimus and dissolving West End Games. Gibson eventually released Bill Coffin's Septimus (2009) as a PDF, which would be the last product from West End Games. Gibson released his core genre books under the OGL, making the D6 system available for use to other publishers. Gibson sold off West End's remaining properties, selling Torg to German publisher Ulisses Spiele, and the Masterbook system and the Bloodshadows and Shatterzone settings to Precis Intermedia.

In April 2016, he sold the rest of West End Games and the D6 System to Nocturnal Media.

References

External links
 

Living people
Role-playing game designers
Year of birth missing (living people)